Bertoncini is an Italian surname. Notable people with the surname include:

 Davide Bertoncini (born 1991) Italian footballer
 Gene Bertoncini (born 1937), American musician
 Mario Bertoncini (1932–2019), Italian musician
 Lisa Buscombe (born Lisa Bertoncini), Canadian archer

Italian-language surnames